The ruddy ctenotus (Ctenotus rubicundus)  is a species of skink found in Western Australia.

References

rubicundus
Reptiles described in 1978
Taxa named by Glen Milton Storr